{{DISPLAYTITLE:C15H12O6}}
The chemical formula C15H12O6 (molar mass : 288.25 g/mol, exact mass : 288.063388) may refer to:

 Aromadedrin, a flavanonol
 Dehydroaltenusin, a polyphenol
 Eriodictyol, flavanone
 Fustin, a flavanonol
 Okanin, a chalcone
 Thunberginol D, an isocoumarin